Robert Topham is the name of:

Robert Topham (cricketer), English cricketer
Robert Topham (footballer), English footballer